René Francis Merino Monroy (born 30 December 1963) is a Salvadoran vice admiral who serves as the incumbent Minister of Defense of El Salvador under President Nayib Bukele.

Early life 

René Francis Merino Monroy was born on 30 December 1963 in Santa Tecla, El Salvador.

He entered the Captain General Gerardo Barrios Military School in Santa Tecla in January 1986, was later transferred to Fort Benning in Columbus, Georgia in June 1986, and later returned to the Capitán General Gerardo Barrios Military School in December 1986. He transferred to the Arturo Prat Naval School in Valparaíso, Chile, in February 1987, and was later retransferred back to the Capitán General Gerardo Barrios Military School in December 1990, finally graduating in March 1990.

Minister of National Defense 

He was selected by President-elect Nayib Bukele to be his Minister of Defense. Merino Monroy was sworn in on 1 June 2019. He was the first ever Salvadoran naval officer to hold the position. Merino Monroy stated he would crack down on gang activity in the country on 11 June 2019.

René Merino Monroy faced controversy in early 2020 after President Bukele promoted him to Counter Admiral on 31 December 2019. In El Salvador, a military officer goes into "retirement status" at age 55 which prevents them from receiving further promotions, but Merino Monroy was 56 at the time of his promotion. Lawyers argued that his promotion was illegal according to article 13 of the Military Career Law, but Merino Monroy defended his promotion stating "in active service, I am the oldest in the Armed Forces. In the Navy there are fewer of us who obtain the rank of [counter admiral]." He added, "I submitted, like all my military promotion, to the pertinent evaluations, being evaluated by an evaluation and selection tribunal appointed in the previous administration." He was again promoted on 1 January 2021 to the rank of Vice Admiral.

On 9 February 2020, Nayib Bukele and René Merino Monroy had 40 soldiers occupy the Legislative Assembly building to pressure politicians into approving a 109 million dollar loan from the United States to go into funding Bukele's "Territorial Control Plan." The event was called a self coup attempt by the Nationalist Republican Alliance (ARENA) and the Farabundo Martí National Liberation Front (FMLN). He was summoned to the Legislative Assembly on 21 August 2020 and asked who ordered the military to the Legislative Assembly, but Merino Monroy refused to answer.

When murder rates rose in the country in April 2020, Merino Monroy credited the rise to the release of one prisoner who was a gang member. He went on to defend Bukele's order to use lethal force if necessary stating that the measure will protect Salvadoran lives.

Critics from ARENA and FMLN accuse him of being more loyal to the President than the Constitution.

Personal life 

Merino Monroy had a son, frigate Lieutenant Gerardo Antonio Merino Marroquín, who died in a plane crash, along with two other military personnel, on 2 December 2021 in the Pacific Ocean.

Awards and decorations 

Military Campaign Medal
Gold Medal of Merit (x2)
Mare Nostrum Medal

Minerva Medal

Medal of Honor to Naval Merit

Medal of Honor

See also 

 Cabinet of Nayib Bukele
 List of current defense ministers

References 

1963 births
Living people
Salvadoran military personnel
Defence ministers of El Salvador
Captain General Gerardo Barrios Military School alumni